Pet Shop is a 1994 science fantasy children's film by Moonbeam Entertainment. The film's plot involves an alien couple that comes to Earth in disguise.

Plot
An alien couple comes to Earth disguised as a cowboy and cowgirl and buy a pet shop from its owner in an attempt to kidnap the children for sale as pets to fellow aliens in their own pet shop. They look like normal people aside from the fact that they have a third eye on their foreheads which they cover with their hats. One by one they give some pets to random kids free of charge. The pets at first seem normal, until they change into their alien forms. The kids meet when they return to the pet shop because their pets stop eating and need some type of "vitamins" that the aliens feed them.

Cast

Release
Originally intended for a release in the summer of 1994, the film ended up being released on videocassette on March 28, 1995, though it did get released on video in Australia in December 1994. Full Moon released a new remastered Blu-Ray on December 11, 2018.

External links

1994 films
1994 fantasy films
1990s science fiction comedy films
Puppet films
1994 comedy films
1990s English-language films